This is a list of all stations of the Jaipur Metro, a rapid transit system serving Jaipur of India.

Jaipur Metro is the sixth transit system in India, after Kolkata Metro, Delhi Metro,  Namma Metro, Rapid Metro Gurgaon, and Mumbai Metro. It is built and operated by the Jaipur Metro Rail Corporation Limited (JMRC). Its first and currently only section opened on June 3, 2015, with the Pink Line.

Metro stations

Statistics

See also
Jaipur Metro
Jaipur Bus Rapid Transit System
Urban rail transit in India
List of metro systems

References

External links

 Jaipur Metro Rail Corporation Ltd.
 Jaipur Metro Guide

Stations
Metro stations
Jaipur Metro stations